Gilbert Ramon Yvel (born 30 June 1976) is a Dutch professional mixed martial artist. A professional competitor since 1997, Yvel competed in the PRIDE Fighting Championships, Affliction, the UFC, Road FC, the RFA, RINGS, M-1 Challenge, Cage Rage, K-1, and Showtime promotions. He is the former RINGS Openweight Champion.

Background 
Yvel was born in the Netherlands of Surinamese descent. He was raised as an orphan in the neighborhood of the Bijlmermeer in Amsterdam. As of 2010 he held a Brazilian jiu-jitsu purple belt under John Lewis.

Mixed martial arts career

RINGS 
Yvel came into contact with kickboxing and MMA through his brother, and after only two years of training he made his debut at 17 years of age, representing Vos Gym. Gilbert was off to a flying start winning his first 9 fights, primarily fighting for the Fighting Network RINGS promotion, initially only in events hosted by its Dutch brand. One of his first opponents would be Bas Rutten's apprentice Leon Dijk, whom he defeated by KO, as well as "dirty" Bob Schrijber. In another of his performances, he squared off against Bas Jussen in an event promoted by RINGS Holland leader Chris Dolman. This fight would become controversial because Yvel, after getting his leg embraced by Jussen in a missed flying knee, grabbed the fence to keep himself vertical and then, still hanging off the cage, delivered several knees and axe kicks on his opponent's head. Yvel would go to win the match shortly after.

His first loss came in 1998 in a rematch against Schrijber, being knocked out in the first round. Yvel had actually met his biological mother for the first time two days before the fight. He would follow with a participation representing RINGS Holland in the Russian tournament Pankration European Championship, where he would face RINGS Russia fighter Karimula Barkalaev. Although Yvel dominated the match, he was disqualified after Barkalaev's coach Volk Han noted the referee Yvel had illegally bitten his fighter.

In the following years Yvel came to be considered the best Dutch Heavyweight fighter active on the European fighting circuit. He got a victory over teammate Valentijn Overeem by TKO, as well as a high level one over RINGS England chief Lee Hasdell. In April 1999, Yvel was finally called to Japan by RINGS, where he fought Tsuyoshi Kohsaka. Through the match, Yvel left himself behind by five points due to multiple fouls, which included grabbing the ropes, hitting the face on the ground, striking against an opponent on the knees and, in spectacular fashion, hanging himself off the turnbuckle in order to land a knee to the face. However, he rallied over in points with a palm strike and a tight guillotine choke, and finally won the match when it was stopped due to accumulated damage to Kohsaka's face. He then would fly back to Holland in order to face Semmy Schilt in an interpromotional match. The bout was particularly intriguing because Schilt belonged to Pancrase, RINGS's rival promotion in Japan.

The fight was met under special rules, with Gilbert keeping his gloves for punching while Schilt preferred to go barehanded and use open palm strikes like it was done in Pancrase. Although Schilt was considered a heavy favourite, sporting a huge advantage in both weight and height and boasting victories over Masakatsu Funaki and Guy Mezger, Yvel proved himself at the first minutes of the match by scoring a shocking knockdown on Schilt by a flurry of hooks. The Pancrase fighter recovered with knees to the body and took Yvel down repeatedly in an attempt to submit him, but the ruleset's quick stand-ups and Yvel's own defensive acumen impeded any advance in this field. Meanwhile, while Schilt still won the earlier stand-up exchanges, Yvel eventually took over and bloodied Schilt's eye with punches and a possible eye gouge which was dismissed by the referee. At the end of several grinding assaults, Yvel overpowered Schilt and landed a long series of unanswered punches, finally knocking Schilt out on his feet for the victory.

In his return to Japan, Yvel was scheduled in a rematch with Tsuyoshi Kohsaka. This time, however, Yvel was forced to spend a rope escape by an early toehold, and shortly after had to defend on the ground after being thrown down by the judo specialist. With Gilbert behind on points, the match was stood up, but then it was suddenly stopped when Kohsaka, trying another judo throw, made both them fall outside the ring and was rendered injured by the fall. The bout was declared no contest, but as Yvel had lost a point while Kohsaka hadn't lost any of them, the Japanese was controversially declared winner by points.

In December 1999, Yvel qualified for the King of Kings world tournament. He eliminated karate champion Tariel Bitsadze by armbar on the first round, and went to avenge his defeat to Kohsaka in the second, stopping him by a cut caused by a grazing punch. Yvel would face eventual winner Dan Henderson in his block's final match. The American controlled the wrestling and seemed to have an armbar locked, but Yvel rolled out of it and utilized a strategy consistent on trying to strike between takedown and takedown. In one of those instances, he got a yellow card for landing an illegal elbow to Henderson's spine. At the end, although Yvel landed solid shots, he couldn't finish Henderson and was eliminated by unanimous decision.

Yvel's last bout in RINGS would be against Kiyoshi Tamura in a match for the RINGS Openweight Championship. Again, Yvel was taken down and positionally controlled on the mat, but he resisted successfully Tamura's scarce submission attempts and knocked him out via strikes. He won the title, but was forced to vacate it shortly after due to signing up with PRIDE.

Affliction 
In 2008 Yvel signed a three-fight deal with Affliction Entertainment, his first and only fight on the contract was against Josh Barnett at Affliction's 24 January 2009 "Day of Reckoning" event in Anaheim, California before Affliction abandoned MMA promotion.
During the fight, Yvel showed great resilience against his wrestling opponent and kept an active guard which prevented Barnett from submitting him in the first two rounds, until Yvel finally succumbed to punches at the 3:05 mark of the third round.

Yvel was scheduled to fight Chris Gathers at Affliction: Trilogy, a fight which never materialized due to the folding of the promotion.

Ultimate Fighting Championship 
Yvel fought up-and-coming Brazilian Heavyweight Junior dos Santos at UFC 108 replacing Gabriel Gonzaga for the bout on 2 January.  Yvel lost the fight, with Herb Dean stopping the fight at 2:07 in the first round due to strikes. Yvel protested the stoppage but congratulated Dos Santos for winning the fight moments later.

Yvel next faced Ben Rothwell at UFC 115: Liddell vs. Franklin. Yvel lost by unanimous decision (30–27, 29–28, and 29–28).

Yvel then faced Jon Madsen on 23 October 2010 at UFC 121, replacing an injured Todd Duffee. Both men circled early on in the fight before Madsen shot for a double-leg takedown that downed Yvel after Gilbert slipped when his knee buckled, they ended up against the cage. Madsen then hit Yvel multiple times when Yvel's head was pressed up against the Octagon padding, resulting in the referee stopping the fight. Yvel was subsequently released from his UFC contract after the loss.

Post UFC 
Yvel was scheduled to face former King of the Cage champion Tony Lopez in a PRIDE rules bout at Colosseo Championship Fighting 6: Bushido on 23 July 2011. However, the event was postponed and was then scheduled take place on 3 September. The event was subsequently canceled.

Gilbert Yvel cut down to 205-pounds to compete in the Light-Heavyweight division for Resurrection Fighting Alliance (RFA).  He was successful in his debut in this weight class, defeating Damian Dantibo at RFA 1 – Pulver vs. Elliott. The event took place on Friday, 16 December 2011 at the Viaero Event Center in Kearney, Nebraska. On 30 March 2012, Yvel faced Houston Alexander at RFA 2 – Yvel vs. Alexander, winning by first-round knockout.

Yvel was scheduled to fight against fellow UFC veteran and Brazilian Jiu-Jitsu Champion Marcio Cruz on 2 November 2012 at Resurrection Fighting Alliance 4 in Las Vegas, Nevada. but he was forced out of the bout due to an injury.

Yvel announced his retirement in an interview with Ground and Pound TV. He plans to become a trainer at Agoge MMA in Germany.

Yvel also has fought two kickboxing matches, losing to Ray Sefo and beating Yuji Sakuragi.

Bad conduct and subsequent rehabilitation 
Yvel has acquired, through a number of instances, a lingering reputation in the MMA community for his temper and poor sportsmanship in the ring earlier in his career.

In his May 1998 bout with Karimula Barkalaev, Yvel was disqualified for biting his opponent.

In his September 2001 match with Don Frye, Yvel repeatedly raked his fingers across Frye's face and pushed his thumb into Frye's eyes to avoid being wrestled to the mat. Yvel was disqualified in this match, as well, although the official reason given was for grabbing the ropes.

During Yvel's November 2004 match with Atte Backman, the referee separated the fighters as they were falling over the ropes in a clinched position. Yvel refused the attempts by the referee to get the fighters to resume the clinched position away from ropes, swatting the referee's hand away when he attempted to guide the fighters back together. After a number of unsuccessful attempts to restart the fight in the clinched position, Yvel sucker-punched the referee in the head, dropping him to the canvas, and then kicked him while he was down. This was Yvel's 3rd disqualification in six years.

A scheduled PRIDE 33 match in 2007 with Sergei Kharitonov had to be cancelled when the Nevada State Athletic Commission (NSAC) refused to grant Yvel a license to fight in their state due to his history of poor conduct.

Yvel's 2009 Affliction match-up with Josh Barnett was scheduled to take place in California. Again, because of his past behaviour, there was debate over whether he should be allowed to have a fight license. After taking the unusual step of arranging a personal meeting between Yvel, Assistant Executive Officer Bill Douglas and Chief Athletic Inspector Dean Lohuis, the California State Athletic Commission (CSAC) did license him to fight there.

In October 2009, after a new application, the NSAC again declined to grant Yvel a standard license but did grant him a limited, 1-fight only license to fight in Nevada due to his good conduct since his last instance of poor behaviour in 2004.

Championships and accomplishments

Mixed martial arts 
Fighting Network RINGS
RINGS Openweight Championship (One time)
International Mix-Fight Association
 1998 KO Power Tournament Runner Up
M-1 Global
1997 M-1 MFC Light Heavyweight World Championship Tournament Winner
World Vale Tudo Championship
WVC Superfight Championship (One time)

Mixed martial arts record 

|-
|  Win
| align=center| 40–16–1 (1)
| Mighty Mo
| Technical Submission (armbar)
| Road FC 047
| 
| align=center| 1
| align=center| 3:43
| Beijing, China
| 
|-
|  Win
| align=center| 39–16–1 (1)
| Ricco Rodriguez
| TKO (injury)
| Akhmat Fight Show 31: Ushukov vs. Vagaev
| 
| align=center| 1
| align=center| 1:00
| Grozny, Russia
| 
|-
|  Win
| align=center| 38–16–1 (1)
| Houston Alexander
| KO (punch)
| RFA 2: Yvel vs. Alexander
| 
| align=center| 1
| align=center| 3:59
| Kearney, Nebraska, United States
|
|-
|  Win
| align=center| 37–16–1 (1)
| Damian Dantibo
| TKO (submission to punches)
| RFA 1: Pulver vs. Elliott
| 
| align=center| 1
| align=center| 3:12
| Kearney, Nebraska, United States
| 
|-
|  Loss
| align=center| 36–16–1 (1)
| Jon Madsen
| TKO (punches)
| UFC 121
| 
| align=center| 1
| align=center| 1:48
| Anaheim, California, United States
|
|-
|  Loss
| align=center| 36–15–1 (1)
| Ben Rothwell
| Decision (unanimous)
| UFC 115
| 
| align=center| 3
| align=center| 5:00
| Vancouver, British Columbia, Canada
|
|-
|  Loss
| align=center| 36–14–1 (1)
| Junior dos Santos
| TKO (punches)
| UFC 108
| 
| align=center| 1
| align=center| 2:07
| Las Vegas, Nevada, United States
|
|-
|  Win
| align=center| 36–13–1 (1)
| Pedro Rizzo
| KO (punches)
| Ultimate Chaos: Lashley vs. Sapp
| 
| align=center| 1
| align=center| 2:10
| Biloxi, Mississippi, United States
|
|-
|  Loss
| align=center| 35–13–1 (1)
| Josh Barnett
| TKO (submission to punches)
| Affliction: Day of Reckoning
| 
| align=center| 3
| align=center| 3:05
| Anaheim, California, United States
|
|-
|  Win
| align=center| 35–12–1 (1)
| Alexander Timonov
| TKO (punches)
| M-1 Challenge 9: Russia
| 
| align=center| 1
| align=center| 0:22
| St. Petersburg, Russia
|
|-
|  Win
| align=center| 34–12–1 (1)
| Sergey Shemetov
| Submission (toe hold)
| KOE: Tough Is Not Enough
| 
| align=center| 1
| align=center| 0:53
| Rotterdam, Netherlands
|
|-
|  Win
| align=center| 33–12–1 (1)
| Michał Kita
| KO (punch)
| Gentlemen Fight Night
| 
| align=center| 2
| align=center| 0:02
| Holland, Netherlands
|
|-
|  Win
| align=center| 32–12–1 (1)
| Hakim Gouram
| KO (punch)
| K-1 World Grand Prix 2007 in Amsterdam
| 
| align=center| 1
| align=center| 0:31
| Amsterdam, Netherlands
|
|-
|  Win
| align=center| 31–12–1 (1)
| Akira Shoji
| TKO (punches)
| PRIDE 34
| 
| align=center| 1
| align=center| 3:43
| Saitama, Japan
|
|-
|  Win
| align=center| 30–12–1 (1)
| Rodney Glunder
| KO (punches)
| 2H2H: Pride & Honor
| 
| align=center| 1
| align=center| 1:38
| Rotterdam, Netherlands
|
|-
|  Win
| align=center| 29–12–1 (1)
| Fabiano Scherner
| TKO (punches)
| Cage Rage 17
| 
| align=center| 1
| align=center| 1:30
| London, England, United Kingdom
|
|-
|  Loss
| align=center| 28–12–1 (1)
| Roman Zentsov
| KO (punch)
| PRIDE FC: Total Elimination Absolute
| 
| align=center| 1
| align=center| 4:55
| Osaka, Japan
|
|-
|  Win
| align=center| 28–11–1 (1)
| Valentijn Overeem
| Submission (armbar)
| It's Showtime Boxing & MMA Event 2005 Amsterdam
| 
| align=center| 1
| align=center| 4:30
| Amsterdam, Netherlands
|
|-
|  Loss
| align=center| 27–11–1 (1)
| Ikuhisa Minowa
| Submission (toe hold)
| Pride Bushido 6
| 
| align=center| 1
| align=center| 1:10
| Yokohama, Kanagawa, Japan
|
|-
|  Loss
| align=center|  (1)
| Atte Backman
| DQ (struck the referee)
| Fight Festival 12
| 
| align=center| 1
| align=center| 0:35
| Helsinki, Finland
| 
|-
|  Win
| align=center| 27–9–1 (1)
| Cheick Kongo
| TKO (punches)
| It's Showtime 2004 Amsterdam
| 
| align=center| 2
| align=center| 4:40
| Amsterdam, Netherlands
|
|-
|  Draw
| align=center| 26–9–1 (1)
| Daniel Tabera
| Draw
| M-1 MFC: Russia vs. The World 7
| 
| align=center| 1
| align=center| 10:00
| St. Petersburg, Russia
|
|-
|  Loss
| align=center| 26–9 (1)
| Jeremy Horn
| Decision (unanimous)
| PRIDE 21
| 
| align=center| 3
| align=center| 5:00
| Saitama, Japan
|
|-
|  Win
| align=center| 26–8 (1)
| Bob Schrijber
| TKO (doctor stoppage)
| 2H2H 4: Simply the Best 4
| 
| align=center| N/A
| align=center| N/A
| Rotterdam, Netherlands
|
|-
|  Win
| align=center| 25–8 (1)
| Ibragim Magomedov
| Submission (rear-naked choke)
| M-1 MFC: Russia vs. the World 2
| 
| align=center| N/A
| align=center| 2:45
| St. Petersburg, Russia
|
|-
|  Loss
| align=center| 24–8 (1)
| Don Frye
| DQ (gouging the eyes)
| PRIDE 16
| 
| align=center| 1
| align=center| 7:27
| Osaka, Japan
|
|-
|  Loss
| align=center| 24–7 (1)
| Igor Vovchanchyn
| Submission (rear-naked choke)
| PRIDE 14: Clash of the Titans
| 
| align=center| 1
| align=center| 1:52
| Yokohama, Kanagawa, Japan
|
|-
|  Win
| align=center| 24–6 (1)
| Carlos Barreto
| KO (flying knee)
| 2H2H 2: Simply The Best
| 
| align=center| 1
| align=center| 2:20
| Rotterdam, Netherlands
|
|-
|  Loss
| align=center| 23–6 (1)
| Kazuyuki Fujita
| Decision (unanimous)
| PRIDE 12: Cold Fury
| 
| align=center| 2
| align=center| 10:00
| Saitama, Japan
|
|-
|  NC
| align=center| 23–5 (1)
| Wanderlei Silva
| NC (kick to groin)
| PRIDE 11: Battle of the Rising Sun
| 
| align=center| 1
| align=center| 0:21
| Osaka, Japan
| 
|-
|  Win
| align=center| 23–5
| Gary Goodridge
| KO (head kick)
| PRIDE 10: Return of the Warriors
| 
| align=center| 1
| align=center| 0:28
| Tokorozawa, Saitama, Japan
|
|-
|  Loss
| align=center| 22–5
| Vitor Belfort
| Decision (unanimous)
| PRIDE 9
| 
| align=center| 2
| align=center| 10:00
| Nagoya, Aichi, Japan
|
|-
|  Win
| align=center| 22–4
| Kiyoshi Tamura
| TKO
| RINGS: Millennium Combine 1
| 
| align=center| 1
| align=center| 13:13
| Tokyo, Japan
| 
|-
|  Win
| align=center| 21–4
| Brian Dunn
| TKO (punches)
| 2H2H 1: 2 Hot 2 Handle
| 
| align=center| 1
| align=center| 0:21
| Rotterdam, Netherlands
|
|-
|  Loss
| align=center| 20–4
| Dan Henderson
| Decision (unanimous)
| RINGS: King of Kings 1999 Final
| 
| align=center| 2
| align=center| 5:00
| Tokyo, Japan
| 
|-
|  Win
| align=center| 20–3
| Joop Kasteel
| KO (palm strikes)
| RINGS Holland: There Can Only Be One Champion
| 
| align=center| 1
| align=center| 4:16
| Utrecht, Netherlands
|
|-
|  Win
| align=center| 19–3
| Tsuyoshi Kohsaka
| TKO (doctor stoppage)
| rowspan=2|RINGS: King of Kings 1999 Block B
| rowspan=2|
| align=center| 1
| align=center| 1:17
| rowspan=2|Osaka, Japan
| 
|-
|  Win
| align=center| 18–3
| Tariel Bitsadze
| Submission (armbar)
| align=center| 1
| align=center| 2:18
| 
|-
|  Win
| align=center| 17–3
| Dennis Reed
| KO (flying knee)
| AAC 2: Amsterdam Absolute Championship 2
| 
| align=center| 1
| align=center| 1:43
| Amsterdam, Netherlands
|
|-
|  Win
| align=center| 16–3
| Fabio Piamonte
| TKO
| WVC 9: World Vale Tudo Championship 9
| 
| align=center| 1
| align=center| 2:28
| Aruba
|
|-
|  Loss
| align=center| 15–3
| Tsuyoshi Kohsaka
| Technical Decision (lost points)
| RINGS: Rise 5th
| 
| align=center| 1
| align=center| 8:17
| Japan
|
|-
|  Win
| align=center| 15–2
| Semmy Schilt
| KO (punches)
| RINGS Holland: The Kings of the Magic Ring
| 
| align=center| 2
| align=center| 4:45
| Utrecht, Netherlands
|
|-
|  Win
| align=center| 14–2
| Tsuyoshi Kohsaka
| TKO (doctor stoppage)
| RINGS: Rise 2nd
| 
| align=center| 1
| align=center| 14:58
| Japan
|
|-
|  Win
| align=center| 13–2
| Todd Medina
| KO (knee)
| WVC: World Vale Tudo Championship
| 
| align=center| 1
| align=center| 0:10
| Aruba
|
|-
|  Win
| align=center| 12–2
| Big Mo T
| KO (flying knee)
| RINGS Holland: Judgement Day
| 
| align=center| 1
| align=center| 1:59
| Amsterdam, Netherlands
|
|-
|  Win
| align=center| 11–2
| Lee Hasdell
| TKO (doctor stoppage)
| RINGS Holland: The Thialf Explosion
| 
| align=center| N/A
| align=center| N/A
| Heerenveen, Netherlands
|
|-
|  Win
| align=center| 10–2
| Valentijn Overeem
| TKO (shoulder injury)
| RINGS Holland: Who's the Boss
| 
| align=center| 1
| align=center| 0:38
| Utrecht, Netherlands
|
|-
|  Loss
| align=center| 9–2
| Karimula Barkalaev
| DQ (biting)
| IAFC: Pankration European Championship 1998
| 
| align=center| 1
| align=center| 4:49
| Moscow, Russia
|
|-
|  Loss
| align=center| 9–1
| Bob Schrijber
| KO
| rowspan=2|IMA: KO Power Tournament
| rowspan=2|
| align=center| 1
| align=center| 4:15
| rowspan=2|Amsterdam, Netherlands
| 
|-
|  Win
| align=center| 9–0
| Algirdas Darulis
| TKO (3 knockdowns)
| align=center| 1
| align=center| 3:02
| 
|-
|  Win
| align=center| 8–0
| Bob Schrijber
| Submission (achilles lock)
| RINGS Holland: The King of Rings
| 
| align=center| 2
| align=center| 1:12
| Amsterdam, Netherlands
|
|-
|  Win
| align=center| 7–0
| Bas Jussen
| KO
| RDFF 2: Red Devil Free Fight 2
| 
| align=center| N/A
| align=center| N/A
| Amsterdam, Netherlands
|
|-
|  Win
| align=center| 6–0
| Oleg Tsygolnik
| KO (punch)
| rowspan=2|M-1 MFC: World Championship 1997
| rowspan=2|
| align=center| 1
| align=center| 1:41
| rowspan=2|St. Petersburg, Russia
| 
|-
|  Win
| align=center| 5–0
| Sergei Tunic
| KO (punches)
| align=center| 1
| align=center| 1:16
| 
|-
|  Win
| align=center| 4–0
| Pedro Palm
| TKO
| Gym Almaar: Fight Gala
| 
| align=center| N/A
| align=center| N/A
| Bergen, Netherlands
|
|-
|  Win
| align=center| 3–0
| Vyacheslav Kiselyov
| TKO (knees)
| RDFF 1: Red Devil Free Fight 1
| 
| align=center| 1
| align=center| 0:51
| Amsterdam, Netherlands
|
|-
|  Win
| align=center| 2–0
| Leon Dijk
| KO (knee)
| RINGS Holland: Utrecht at War
| 
| align=center| 1
| align=center| 2:05
| Utrecht, Netherlands
|
|-
|  Win
| align=center| 1–0
| Rob van Leeuwen
| TKO (corner stoppage)
| RINGS Holland: The Final Challenge
| 
| align=center| 1
| align=center| 4:06
| Amsterdam, Netherlands
|

Kickboxing record 

|-
|
|Win
|Yuji Sakuragi
|Shoot Boxing Battle Summit "Ground Zero
|Tokyo, Japan
|TKO (3 Knockdowns)
|align="center"|1
|align="center"|1:48
|1–1
|-
|
|Loss
|Ray Sefo
|K-1 World Grand Prix 2002 in Fukuoka
|Fukuoka, Japan
|KO (Low Kicks)
|align="center"|2
|align="center"|2:07
|0–1
|-
|-
| colspan=9 | Legend:

References

External links 
 
 

1976 births
Living people
Dutch male kickboxers
Heavyweight kickboxers
Dutch male mixed martial artists
Heavyweight mixed martial artists
Dutch practitioners of Brazilian jiu-jitsu
Dutch Muay Thai practitioners
Mixed martial artists utilizing Muay Thai
Mixed martial artists utilizing silat
Mixed martial artists utilizing shootboxing
Mixed martial artists utilizing Brazilian jiu-jitsu
Sportspeople from Amsterdam
Dutch sportspeople of Surinamese descent
Dutch expatriate sportspeople in the United States
Ultimate Fighting Championship male fighters